The Bestune T33 is a subcompact crossover SUV launched in 2019 by Bestune of FAW.

Overview

The Bestune T33 is launched in July 2019, and is originally based on the Bestune X40 shown at the 2016 Guangzhou Auto Show while the whole vehicle received a complete makeover to replace the X40.

Specifications
The front and rear of the Bestune T33 features the design language inline with the compact Bestune T77 launched earlier, and is followed by the mid-size Bestune T99 and compact Bestune T55 crossovers. The T33 also features 18-inch tires. The interior of the T33 is equipped with a full LCD 3D naked eye dashboard and a 10.25-inch central control LCD screen with FAW's D-Life 4.0 intelligent network connection infotainment system and a virtual assistant called YOMI which could be customized.

Powertrain
At the market launch, the car was powered exclusively by a 1.6-liter gasoline engine with intake manifold injection and a maximum output of 84 kW (114 hp) shared with the previous X40. The engine is optionally available with a 5-speed manual transmission or a 6-speed automatic transmission. At the end of 2020, this engine was replaced by a supercharged 1.2-liter gasoline engine with 105 kW (143 hp).

See also
Bestune
Bestune T55
Bestune T77
Bestune T99
Senia R7

References

Cars of China
Cars introduced in 2019
Subcompact cars
Crossover sport utility vehicles
Front-wheel-drive vehicles